The Alor Archipelago is located at the eastern Lesser Sunda Islands.

Alor is the largest island in the archipelago which is located at its eastern end. Pantar is the second-largest island in the archipelago. Smaller islands in the group include  Kepa, Buaya, Ternate (not to be confused with Ternate in the North Moluccas), Pura and Tereweng. Administratively, the Alor archipelago forms its own regency (Indonesian: kabupaten) within the province of East Nusa Tenggara.  The Regency is divided into seventeen districts and 158 villages, and has an area of 2,928.88 km2 and a population at the 2020 Census of 211,872.

To the east of the archipelago is the Ombai Strait, which separates it from the islands of Wetar and Atauro, the latter belonging to East Timor. To the south, across the Strait of Alor, lies the western part of Timor. To the north lies the Banda Sea. To the west lies the rest of the Sunda Islands.

External links
 
Van Galen's Memorandum on the Alor Islands in 1946, part 1
Van Galen's Memorandum on the Alor Islands in 1946, part 2
 Hans Hägerdal (2010) "Cannibals and pedlars: Economic opportunity and political alliance in Alor, 1600-1850", Indonesia and the Malay World, 38 (111).

References

 
Archipelagoes of Indonesia
Lesser Sunda Islands
Inner Banda Arc